Mahanta kawadai is a moth in the genus Mahanta. It's in the family Limacodidae. It is found in Taiwan.

References 

Limacodidae
Moths described in 1995